Nuestra Belleza Yucatán 2011, was held in the Hacienda Chichí Suárez in Mérida, Yucatán on June 16, 2011. At the conclusion of the final night of competition Jéssica Duarte of Mérida was crowned the winner. Duarte was crowned by outgoing Nuestra Belleza Yucatán titleholder María Fernanda López. Six contestants competed for the title.

Results

Placements

Judges
Ofelia Correa - Regional Coordinator of Nuestra Belleza México
Luis Moya - Dermatologist
Abril Cervera Bates - Designer

Background Music
Aarón Díaz

Contestants

References

External links
Official Website

Nuestra Belleza México